PNC may refer to:

Government and politics
 Congolese National Police, in French: Police nationale congolaise
 Colombian National Police, in Spanish: Policía Nacional de Colombia
 National Civil Police of El Salvador, in Spanish: Policía Nacional Civil
 Palestinian National Council, the legislative body of the Palestine Liberation Organization
 Partitu di a Nazione Corsa (Party of the Corsican Nation), a nationalist political party in Corsica
 People's National Congress (Guyana), a socialist political party in Guyana
 Police National Computer in the United Kingdom

Companies and organizations
 PNC Financial Services, a Fortune 500 company
 Pacific Northwest Conference, an intercollegiate athletic conference from 1926 to 1984
 Purdue University North Central, a former branch of Purdue University in Westville, Indiana, now a campus of Purdue University Northwest
 Prince Aviation, ICAO airline code
 Pakistan Nursing Council

Other
 Pacific Northwest Corridor, one of eleven federally designated high-speed rail corridors in the U.S.
 Plate number coil, a postage stamp with the number of the printing plate printed on it
 PNC (rapper), New Zealand rapper

See also
 PNC Center (disambiguation)
 P&C (disambiguation)